Mons Huygens is the Moon's tallest mountain (but not its highest point, which is Selenean Summit). Adjacent to the west is Mons Ampère. The Montes Apenninus were formed by the impact that created Mare Imbrium. The mountain was named after the Dutch astronomer, mathematician and physician Christiaan Huygens.

Surroundings

See also
List of tallest mountains in the Solar System
Astrogeology

References

External links

Mons Huygens at the Moon Wiki
Annotated map  (source)

Mountains on the Moon
Mons Huygens